Petronius is a crater on Mercury. Its name was adopted by the International Astronomical Union (IAU) on the August 6, 2012. Petronius is named for the Roman author Petronius.

Petronius has a region of permanent shadow on much of its floor, which has a bright radar signature.  This is interpreted to represent a deposit of water ice.

References

Impact craters on Mercury